The 1997–98 season was the 83rd season of the Isthmian League, which is an English football competition featuring semi-professional and amateur clubs from London, East and South East England. The league consisted of four divisions.

Premier Division

The Premier Division consisted of 22 clubs, including 18 clubs from the previous season and four new clubs:
 Basingstoke Town, promoted as runners-up in Division One
 Chesham United, promoted as champions of Division One
 Gravesend & Northfleet, transferred from the Southern League
 Walton & Hersham, promoted as third in Division One

Kingstonian won the division and were promoted to the Football Conference to reach the highest level in the club history. Yeading, Hitchin Town and Oxford City finished bottom of the table and relegated to the First Division.

League table

Division One

Division One consisted of 22 clubs, including 16 clubs from the previous season and six new clubs:
Three clubs relegated from the Premier Division:
 Chertsey Town
 Grays Athletic
 Staines Town

Three clubs promoted from Division Two:
 Leatherhead
 Collier Row & Romford
 Wembley

Before the start of the season Collier Row & Romford F.C. were renamed Romford.

Aldershot Town won the division and were promoted to the Premier Division along with Billericay Town and Hampton. Wokingham Town, Abingdon Town and Thame United relegated to Division Two.

League table

Division Two

Division Two consisted of 22 clubs, including 16 clubs from the previous season and six new clubs:

Three clubs relegated from Division One:
 Canvey Island
 Marlow
 Tooting & Mitcham United

Three clubs promoted from Division Three:
 Braintree Town
 Northwood
 Wealdstone

Canvey Island won the division and returned to Division One straight after relegation from it along with Braintree Town and Wealdstone, both achieved the second promotions in two seasons. Tilbury relegated to Division Three along with Egham Town and Abingdon Town.

League table

Division Three

Division Three consisted of 20 clubs, including 14 clubs from the previous season and six new clubs:

Three clubs relegated from Division Two:
 Dorking
 Hemel Hempstead
 Ware

Plus:
 Corinthian-Casuals, promoted as runners-up in the Combined Counties League
 Croydon Athletic, promoted as third in the Spartan League
 Ford United, promoted as champions of the Essex Senior League

Hemel Hempstead won the division and returned to Division Two straight after relegation along with Hertford Town and Harlow Town.

League table

See also
Isthmian League
1997–98 Northern Premier League
1997–98 Southern Football League

References

Isthmian League seasons
6